The Champlain Apartment Building, also known as the Orme Building, is an historic structure located at 1424 K St., Northwest, Washington, D.C. in the Downtown neighborhood.

History
The building was designed by architect Clinton Smith and constructed in 1905. A real estate venture of Senator Redfield Proctor of Vermont (who was also the president of the Vermont Marble Company), it features a white marble Beaux-Arts Classical façade. The building exemplifies the importance of elected officials on Washington's design and the significance of private construction in implementing the City Beautiful movement in Washington.  Converted into an office building, it was listed on the National Register of Historic Places in 1994.

References

Residential buildings completed in 1905
Office buildings in Washington, D.C.
Beaux-Arts architecture in Washington, D.C.
Residential buildings on the National Register of Historic Places in Washington, D.C.
Apartment buildings in Washington, D.C.
1905 establishments in Washington, D.C.